Zhamalong Railway Station is a railway station on the Qingzang railway. It serves Zhamalong and is located 35 km from Xining Railway Station.

See also
List of stations on Qingzang railway

Railway stations in Qinghai
Stations on the Qinghai–Tibet Railway